Chaffer is a surname. Notable people with the surname include:

Lucy Chaffer (born 1983), Australian skeleton racer
Ross Chaffer (born 1972), Australian sprint canoeist 
Norman Chaffer (1899—1992), Australian businessman
Don and Lori Chaffer, founding members of the band Waterdeep

See also
Haffer